Bipalium is a genus of large predatory land planarians. They are often loosely called "hammerhead worms" or "broadhead planarians" because of the distinctive shape of their head region. Land planarians are unique in that they possess a "creeping sole", a highly ciliated region on the ventral epidermis that helps them to creep over the substrate. Several species are considered invasive to the United States, Canada, and Europe. Some studies have begun the investigation of the evolutionary ecology of these invasive planarians.

Etymology 
The name Bipalium comes from Latin bi-, "two" + pala, "shovel" or "spade", because species in this genus resemble a pickaxe.

Description 
The genus Bipalium was initially defined by Stimpson to include land planarians with the head broadened, forming a head plate. Later, in 1899, Ludwig von Graff divided it into three genera according to the shape of the head:
Bipalium: with a well-developed head plate, much broader than long, and with elongated lateral auricles
Perocephalus: rudimentary head plate, not much broader than the body
Placocephalus: flat head plate with a circular outline

Josef Müller, in 1902, considered that no sufficient anatomical basis existed for this distinction, and reunited them under Bipalium. Later, von Graff accepted Müller's conclusions.

Towards the end of the 20th century, Robert E. Ogren and Masaharu Kawakatsu started a series of publications called "The Land Planarian Index series" in which they reviewed and organized all taxonomic information regarding land planarians. At first, they retained all broad-headed planarians in the genus Bipalium, but later split them into four genera based on the anatomy of the reproductive organs: Bipalium, Novibipalium, Humbertium, and Diversibipalium.

Under this scenario, the genus Bipalium is defined as containing broad-headed land planarians with simple copulatory organs, without accessory ducts or copulatory bursa, and with a fold of tissue separating the male and female exit ducts.

Feeding habits 
Bipalium species are predatory. Some species prey on earthworms, while others may also feed on mollusks. These flatworms can track their prey. When captured, earthworms begin to react to the attack, but the flatworm uses the muscles in its body, as well as sticky secretions, to attach itself to the earthworm to prevent escape. The planarians cover, or cap, the prostomium, peristomium, and anterior end to stop the violent reaction by the earthworm.

To feed on their prey, species of Bipalium often evert their pharynges from their mouths, located on the midventral portion of their bodies, and secrete enzymes that begin the digestion of the prey. The liquefied tissues are sucked into the branching gut of the flatworms by ciliary action.

Reproduction 
Reproduction in Bipalium may be asexual or sexual and all species are hermaphroditic.

 B. adventitium reproduces sexually and creates egg capsules, which hatch around 3 weeks post-deposition. The egg capsules have a tough exterior and generally contain multiple juveniles.

 B. kewense have rarely been observed using egg capsules as a primary method of reproduction. Asexual fragmentation is its main reproductive strategy in temperate regions and most individuals never develop sexual organs. Juveniles of this species, unlike B. adventitium, do not appear the same coloration as parents in their early days.

Toxicity 
In 2014, the presence of tetrodotoxin, a very dangerous neurotoxin, was recorded in B. adventitium and B. kewense. It is the first record of tetrodotoxin in terrestrial invertebrates.

Invasive species 

Little is known about the ecology of terrestrial planarians, but research has been done on different genera and species, including several native and invasive species in Brazil, Arthurdendyus triangulatus, Rhynchodemus  and Bipalium.

Currently, four invasive species of Bipalium are known in the United States: B. adventitium, B. kewense, B. pennsylvanicum, and B. vagum. These planarians are thought to have come to the US on horticultural plants.

Bipalium kewense has been found commonly in American greenhouses since 1901. This species is a voracious predator of earthworms, and has been identified as a nuisance in the southern USA in earthworm-rearing beds. Control of the species is difficult due to the lack of predators. As noted by the University of Florida IFAS department,
Other animals rarely devour land planarians, since surface secretions appear distasteful, if not toxic. Protozoans, including flagellates, ciliates, sporozoans, and nematodes have been detected in land planarians. Because of their cannibalistic habit, land planarians may be their own worst enemy.

Specimens of Bipalium adventitium are characterized by a single dark dorsal stripe. They were first discovered in the US in California and New York but have been found in Illinois as well as most northern states. In 2019, were discovered in Montreal, Canada. B. kewense have five dark dorsal stripes and a partial dark collar. They have undergone several name changes since their discovery in North America. B. kewense is commonly found across the southern regions of the US. B. kewense is found worldwide in tropical and subtropical regions. Bipalium pennsylvanicum is characterized by its dark brown head and three dorsal stripes. As of 2014, it has only been found in Pennsylvania and in coastal South Carolina. Bipalium vagum is characterized by two dark dorsal blotches on the head, a thick black band around the neck, and three dark dorsal stripes. This species has been found in several Gulf Coast states, and in 2022, specimens were located extending further north into Arkansas. Recently, it was found in Mumbai, India.

Image gallery

Species 
The genus Bipalium currently includes the following species:

Bipalium adensameri 
Bipalium admarginatum 
Bipalium adventitium 
Bipalium albo-coeruleus 
Bipalium alternans 
Bipalium bengalensis 
Bipalium bergendali 
Bipalium bimaculatum 
Bipalium chhatarpurensis 
Bipalium choristosperma 
Bipalium costaricensis 
Bipalium crassatrium 
Bipalium distinguendum 
Bipalium dubium 
Bipalium fuscatum 
Bipalium fuscolineatum 
Bipalium gestroi 
Bipalium glandiantrum 
Bipalium glandulosa 
Bipalium glaucum 
Bipalium gracilis 
Bipalium graffi 
Bipalium haberlandti 
Bipalium hilgendorfi 
Bipalium interruptum 
Bipalium janseni 
Bipalium javanum 
Bipalium kaburakii 
Bipalium katoi 
Bipalium kewense 
Bipalium kisoense 
Bipalium kraepelini 
Bipalium manubriatum 
Bipalium marginatum 
Bipalium mjobergi 
Bipalium mondimentum 
Bipalium monolineatum 
Bipalium moseleyi 
Bipalium muninense 
Bipalium myadenosium 
Bipalium nigrum 
Bipalium nobile 
Bipalium ochroleucum 
Bipalium pennsylvanicum 
Bipalium penrissenicum 
Bipalium penzigi 
Bipalium persephone 
Bipalium poiense 
Bipalium rigaudi 
Bipalium robiginosum 
Bipalium semperi 
Bipalium simrothi 
Bipalium strubelli 
Bipalium sudzukii 
Bipalium sylvestre 
Bipalium tetsuyai 
Bipalium unistriatus 
Bipalium univittatum 
Bipalium vagum 
Bipalium virile 
Bipalium weismanni 
Bipalium wiesneri

References

External links 
 Bipalium by University of Maine Turbellarian taxonomic database
 Land planarians by Texas A&M University Insects in the City
 Photograph of B. nobile
 Photograph of B. simrothi

Geoplanidae
Rhabditophora genera
Taxa named by William Stimpson
Articles containing video clips